The 2000 Austrian Grand Prix (formally the XXIV Großer A1 Preis von Österreich) was a Formula One motor race held on 16 July 2000 at the A1-Ring near Spielberg, Styria, Austria with 85,112 spectators in attendance. It was the tenth round of the 2000 Formula One World Championship and the 24th Austrian Grand Prix. McLaren driver Mika Häkkinen won the 71-lap race from pole position. His teammate David Coulthard finished second with Rubens Barrichello third for the Ferrari team.

Michael Schumacher led the World Drivers' Championship with his team Ferrari ahead of McLaren in the World Constructors' Championship going into the race. He started from fourth position alongside his teammate Barrichello. At the first corner BAR's Ricardo Zonta ran into the rear of Michael Schumacher as five other drivers were involved in incidents during the first lap. The accident meant Michael Schumacher retired from the race and the safety car was deployed. Following the withdrawal of safety car after one lap Häkkinen and Coulthard pulled away from the rest of the field. When Häkkinen made his pit stop on lap 38, he rejoined behind Coulthard, but in front of Barrichello. Coulthard made a pit stop on lap 43, returning Häkkinen to the lead which he maintained for the rest of the race to achieve his second victory of the 2000 season and the 16th of his Formula One career.

As a consequence of the Grand Prix, Coulthard's second place finish saw him narrow the gap to Michael Schumacher in the World Drivers' Championship to six points, while Häkkinen's win meant he closed to within two points of his teammate Coulthard. After the Grand Prix, McLaren were deducted 10 points for a post-race technical infringement, resulting in Ferrari maintaining their lead in the World Constructors' Championship by four points over McLaren, with seven races of the season left.

Background
The 2000 Austrian Grand Prix was the tenth of the seventeen rounds of the 2000 Formula One World Championship and was staged at the  A1-Ring on 16 July 2000. There were eleven teams (each representing a different constructor) each fielding two drivers for the event with no changes from the season entry list. Tyre supplier Bridgestone brought the Soft and Medium dry compound tyres to the Grand Prix. The A1-Ring underwent minor safety changes before the race. The modifications were new kerbs placed across the track with flagstones inside the kerbs to prevent dust from accumulating on the circuit. An additional row of tyres were erected at all corners and were designed to increase absorption in the event of a collision.

Entering the race, Ferrari driver Michael Schumacher led the World Drivers' Championship with 56 points, ahead of David Coulthard of McLaren on 44 points and his teammate Mika Häkkinen on 38 points. Ferrari's Rubens Barrichello was fourth on 32 points while Benetton driver Giancarlo Fisichella was fifth with 18 points. In the World Constructors' Championship, Ferrari were leading with 88 points, six points ahead of McLaren in second position. Benetton on 18 points were in third position with Williams in fourth place with 17 points and Jordan fifth on eleven points.

Heinz-Harald Frentzen was fastest on the first day of testing, ahead of Sauber's Pedro Diniz. Alexander Wurz's car was afflicted with an gearbox issue, resulting in repairs which limited his team's testing time. Jaguar driver Eddie Irvine was fastest on the second day. Jos Verstappen for Arrows was quickest on the final day of testing, although his car's front wing was damaged when his engine cover was shed from its chassis. Ferrari and McLaren opted to test at the Mugello Circuit where both teams concentrated their efforts on aerodynamic and suspension set-ups between 4 and 7 July. Ferrari spent one further day performing shakedown runs of their cars at the Fiorano Circuit with their test driver Luca Badoer. Williams and BAR tested at the Autódromo do Estoril from 5 to 7 July where testing consisted of tyre, engine, aerodynamic and set-up optimisation.

Some teams made modifications to their cars for the Grand Prix. McLaren brought an extractor profile that was not used in qualifying or the race at the French Grand Prix and modified the rear suspension along with the introduction of a new Mercedes-Benz engine. Ferrari made slight adjustments of the aerodynamic profile of his car and continued to test chimney stacks in the free practice sessions. BAR finished its package of aerodynamic updates it developed with Honda with the aid of a wind tunnel and introduced in France. The Jordan team's plan to introduce its new car, the EJ10B, in Austria was postponed as its bodywork was required to undergo Fédération Internationale de l'Automobile (FIA) safety tests. This was due to a decision made by the Jordan team to develop the car further and create more spare parts. However, this was the last race that the EJ10 competed, as the EJ10B made its début at the next race.

Practice
A total of four practice sessions took place before the Sunday race, two one-hour sessions Friday and two 45-minute sessions on Saturday. Conditions were dry for the Friday practice sessions. There were 17 drivers who conducted explanatory laps within the opening five minutes of the first practice session. Teams decided that there was enough grip for cars to be sent onto the circuit for evaluation purposes after 15 minutes. Lap times decreased as the conditions of the circuit improved and drivers reacquainted themselves with the track.

Barrichello set the first session's fastest time, at 1 minute and 13.603 seconds shortly before the session concluded, two-tenths of a second quicker than Jarno Trulli for the Jordan team. BAR driver Ricardo Zonta finished with the third-fastest time. Verstappen, Michael Schumacher and Coulthard filled in the next three positions. Fisichella, Jaguar's Johnny Herbert, BAR's Jacques Villeneuve and Mika Salo of Sauber rounded out the top ten positions. Häkkinen's car was afflicted with a mechanical fuel pump issue that forced him to stop at Remus Kurve corner; this restricted him to one out lap and he was slowest overall.

In the second practice session, Coulthard went faster over each lap and set the day's fastest lap, a 1:12.464, after going into the gravel; Häkkinen had a trouble free season and was second-fastest. Salo ran quicker during the session and was third-fastest. Michael Schumacher and Barrichello set the fourth and seventh fastest times respectively; they were separated by Zonta and Trulli. Villeneuve, Diniz and Fisichella completed the top ten positions. Five minutes into the session, Ralf Schumacher stopped his Willaims car with an electrical system failure that caused his engine to stall. Irvine also collided with Coulthard when he slowed and protruded into Coulthard's path.

After the second session Irvine withdrew from the Grand Prix. He had felt unwell upon arrival at the circuit and was diagnosed with suspected appendicitis at the infield medical centre. Irvine took the advice of FIA medical delegate Sid Watkins and travelled to London for further consultation with a surgeon. Tests at hospital determined that Irvine was suffering from a enlargened intestine that was giving him abdominal pain. He was replaced for the rest of the Grand Prix by Jaguar test driver Luciano Burti. The Saturday morning sessions were held in dry conditions and later on a wet track, were grip was poor and some drivers were forced onto the grass after sliding off the track. Häkkinen's time of 1:11.355 was fastest in the third practice session ; Coulthard set the second fastest time. The two Ferrari drivers were third and fourth; Barrichello ahead of Michael Schumacher. Verstappen continued his quick form and lapped fifth quickest, ahead of Fisichella and Villeneuve. Zonta, Trulli and Herbert were in positions eight tot tne. Burti was restricted to one installation lap and he would be required to acquaint himself with the circuit during the final session.

In the final practice session, in which a brief heavy rain shower fell 25 minutes in but proceedings were barely affected, Häkkinen again set the fastest lap, a 1:11.336, despite running a wheel on the grass exiting the uphill right-hand Jochen Rindt Kurve corner and getting beached in the gravel trap before the start/finish straight with ten minutes of the session left; his teammate Coulthard remained second-quickest. Michael Schumacher was third-fastest ahead of teammate Barrichello. Villeneuve was fifth-fastest, ahead of Herbert in sixth. Frentzen, seventh, was able to find a set-up he was comfortable with after being one of the slowest drivers in the preceding three practice sessions. Salo, Fisichella and Arrows driver Pedro de la Rosa made up positions eight to ten. Zonta lost control of his vehicle, reversed back onto the circuit and into the path of an approaching car that was driven onto the grass in avoidance.

Qualifying
Saturday afternoon's one hour qualifying session saw each driver limited to twelve laps, with the starting order decided by their fastest laps. During this session the 107% rule was in effect, requiring each driver to remain within 107 per cent of the fastest lap time to qualify for the race. The session was held in overcast weather conditions. No major incidents occurred during qualifying. Every car except for the Jordans immediately exited the pit lane to set lap times before a brief rainstorm fell on sections of the circuit. Lap times lowered when the sun emerged from the clouds after a quarter of an hour. Häkkinen, after spending time off to de-stress after winning two World Championships, clinched his fourth pole position of the season, his first since the  more than three months earlier, and the 25th of his career with a lap of 1:10.410. Coulthard felt he could have challenged for pole position but he clipped a kerb going into Castrol Kurve on his final run which cost him time. Both drivers were satisfied with their car's balance. Barrichello qualified third and briefly held pole position on a new set of tyres until the McLaren drivers set their lap times. He said that he changed his car's set-up to help him to achieve a better lap time. Michael Schumacher qualified fourth, six-tenths of a second behind Häkkinen, and reported his car's handling was uneven throughout the circuit. He also had a high-speed spin at the second corner during the session and aborted his final run after he made a mistake at the exit of Gösser corner. Trulli qualified fifth, having used the soft compound tyres to set his fastest lap and the Jordan team determining no rain delay at the time.

Zonta and Villeneuve were sixth and seventh respectively due to their new car aerodynamic packages, both drivers spun during the session. Fisichella lapped eighth quickest although he lost a bargeboard when he went off the circuit. He felt he could have secured fifth but a yellow flag caused him to slow. Salo and Verstappen were ninth and tenth. Diniz missed qualifying in the top ten by two-thousands of a second and spun off while setting lap times, triggering a yellow-flag. De La Rosa, twelfth, struggled with the conditions during the session. He qualified ahead of Prost driver Nick Heidfeld and Wurz. Frentzen, 15th, ran the hard compound tyres and his lap times were set early in the session before there was an improvement in track conditions. Frentzen said it was because he felt rain would fall towards the end of qualifying. Herbert started from 16th, after stopping on one run because of a broken left rear suspension caused by a loose suspension bracket at the Niki Lauda Kurve. A rear wishbone on his car had also been flexing. Jean Alesi qualified his Prost car 17th. Jenson Button, 18th, used the spare Williams car set up for Ralf Schumacher because Button's race car had an engine failure, balance problems on the low-grip circuit and slow-speed turns when on the harder tyre compound. Button additionally struggled with driving the spare car. His teammate Ralf Schumacher qualified 19th in the Williams team's worst qualifying performance of the season. The two Minardi drivers of Marc Gené and Gastón Mazzacane qualified 20th and 22nd; both Minardi cars were affected by a lack of grip. Burti in 21st separated both Minardi cars during his first Formula One qualifying session.

Qualifying classification

Warm-up
The drivers took to the track in cloudy and dry conditions at 09:30 Central European Summer Time (UTC+2) for a 30-minute warm-up session. Barrichello set the session's fastest lap time with a 1:12.480 he recorded with two minutes remaining. Coulthard was second and his teammate Häkkinen was third after being fastest until Barrichello's time. Verstappen came fourth after setting the pace after 15 minutes. Barrichello's teammate Michael Schumacher was fifth in the other Ferrari car. Zonta completed the top six, 1.1 seconds slower than Barrichello. The session passed without a major incident. Häkkinen went into the gravel at the right-hand last turn. His teammate Coulthard ran wide at the same corner and went onto the grass before requiring a replacement nose cone following a collision with a Jordan car.

Race
The conditions on the grid were dry and cloudy before the race. While on an reconnaissance lap, Burti's car developed a sudden drop in water pressure and had to start with his team's spare car from the end of the pit lane. Michael Schumacher also opted to use his team's spare car. Häkkinen maintained the lead into the first corner. Coulthard drove alongside his teammate who was on the outside but decided to remain second on the unclean inside of the circuit. The Ferrari pair made slow starts and bunched up the field behind them. Michael Schumacher was on the inside line with his teammate Barrichello on the outside and Zonta close by Schumacher. Barrichello was reported to have been under instruction to allow Schumacher past since his teammate was on a two-stop strategy. McLaren also employed team orders, allowing the driver who entered the first turn in the lead to not be challenged.

Further down the order, Diniz swerved to avoid contact with Verstappen ahead of him and lost control of the rear of his car. Ahead of the three drivers, Zonta outbraked himself and drove into the rear of Michael Schumacher's car, sending Schumacher into a 180-degree spin. Schumacher stopped on the kerbs beside the outside grass. Trulli was close behind Barrichello and simultaneously went into the back of the latter's Ferrari, sending Barrichello onto the gravel to avoid hitting his teammate. Trulli struck the right-front suspension on Michael Schumacher's car. Approaching drivers were required to decide whether they wanted to steer left or right rather than driving straight. Diniz made contact with the sidepod of Salo's vehicle after his teammate noticed the wreckage and slowed, sending Diniz into a spin. Both the BAR and Prost drivers piloted their cars onto the gravel to avoid a collision. Ralf Schumacher spun and stopped close to Diniz and Fisichella's stationary vehicles but was able to restart his car and drive away. 

Race director Charlie Whiting deployed the safety car rather than issuing a stoppage, deciding that the incident did not warrant a race stoppage. Michael Schumacher drove his car onto the racing surface, anticipating a stoppage allowing him to drive the spare car. Marshals cleared debris and removed the stricken cars on the outside just off the racing line with recovery vehicles and removed debris. The safety car was withdrawn at the conclusion of lap two and the race restarted with Häkkinen leading. Verstappen made a pit stop to replace a damaged front wing that took 15.5 seconds to complete. Button was overtaken by Barrichello (nursing a damaged right-rear diffuser) and Frentzen and fell to eighth on lap three. At the third lap's completion, the race order was Häkkinen, Coulthard, Salo, De La Rosa, Herbert, and Barrichello. Both McLaren drivers began to pull away from the rest of the field and exchanged fastest laps, as De La Rosa passed Salo for third at the start of lap four. Barrichello passed Herbert for fifth on that lap. Frentzen in the Jordan became the race's fourth retirement with an engine failure on lap five and spun off on his car's oil that was leaking from his car. Verstappen set a new fastest lap of the race on lap six as he immediately closed on Diniz in 17th. Alesi overtook his teammate Heidfeld for tenth on the following lap.Häkkinen continued to set fastest laps and opened the gap between Coulthard and De La Rosa to five seconds by lap eight. Barrichello claimed fourth position after passing Salo on the same lap and Ralf Schumacher made a pit stop for a new front wing. Ralf Schumacher went into the garage for repairs to his left-front brake on the following lap. By lap 13, Häkkinen's gap to Coulthard was two seconds, who in turn was a further ten seconds in front of De La Rosa. Barrichello was a further six seconds behind De La Rosa, but was drawing ahead of Salo in fifth. Verstappen suffered an gearbox failure and became the race's fifth retirement on lap 15. On lap 16, Diniz and Zonta were given ten-second stop-go penalties, both for their roles in the lap one accidents following a review of television coverage. They took their penalties immediately. Ralf Schumacher emerged from his garage to rejoin the race two laps later. Häkkinen had extended his lead over Coulthard to 10.9 seconds by lap 24. Alesi, who was on a two-stop strategy, became the first driver to make a scheduled pit stop on the same lap and exited the pit lane in thirteenth place. On lap 25, Zonta was involved in another collision when he attempted to pass Mazzacane at Castrol Kurve corner, which promoted Diniz to 14th position.

After Häkkinen had built up a 15.2-second lead over teammate Coulthard in second by the 30th lap, McLaren opted to slightly slow him and his teammate by displaying pit boards instructed them to reduce their revolutions per minute to preserve their engines. On lap 33, De La Rosa made a pit stop from third to retire from the race with a gearbox oil leak after Arrows detected abnormally high gearbox temperatures. This moved Button to sixth position. Wurz dropped to tenth after running eighth by lap 34. Häkkinen's lead had grown to more than 17 seconds when he made his one and only pit stop on lap 38, emerging in second position. His teammate Coulthard led the next three laps before his solitary pit stop of the Grand Prix came on lap 42. Coulthard returned to the circuit behind Häkkinen, who was fast on a full tank of fuel and wanted to ensure that his teammate would be not close enough to threaten for the race victory. Salo, Herbert, Barrichello, Button and Villeneuve all made pit stops over the next five laps. Alesi, who was 14th, but yet to make his final pit stop, attempted to pass teammate Heidfeld but the two drivers retired after colliding at the first corner on lap 43. 

At the conclusion of lap 50, with the scheduled pit stops completed, the running order was Häkkinen, Coulthard, Barrichello, Villeneuve, Button, and Salo. Button ran wide challenging Villeneuve for fourth on lap 51; he remained ahead of Salo. Zonta abandoned his car in the gravel at Remus Kurve corner with engine overheating problems on lap 60. On the same lap, Mazzacane was issued a 10-second stop-go penalty. He took his penalty on lap 61. Ralf Schumacher spun off the track due to brake failure and retired on the following lap. Coulthard set the fastest lap of the race a 1:11.783 on lap 66, as he was within nine seconds of Häkkinen who was slower on that lap, although it appeared that the latter would win the race comfortably. Coulthard finished second 12.5 seconds behind, ahead of Barrichello in third. Villeneuve finished fourth by remaining on the circuit longer than any other driver and setting fast lap times, with Button close behind in fifth. Salo completed the points scorers in sixth. Herbert, Gené, Diniz and Wurz were in the next four positions, albeit one lap behind the winner, with Burti and Mazzacane the final classified finishers.

Post-race
The top three drivers appeared on the podium to collect their trophies and in the subsequent press conference. Häkkinen said that he was happy with his race victory which he believed would help his confidence throughout the remainder of the season. Häkkinen added that his team displaying pit boards made him unsure as to whether he had an issue or whether he was being instructed not to go faster. Coulthard said that he was satisfied with the outcome of the first lap as it allowed him to drive a conservative race. He added that his strong finish would not mean that he would think about his potential to win the Drivers' Championship. Barrichello explained that his car was loose from contact with Trulli during the race's early stages which prevented him from challenging De La Rosa.
 
Villeneuve was pleased with his fourth-place finish saying that despite making an inclement start, his strategy allowed him to run quicker when there were no back markers slowing him. After Button's fifth position at the race, the Williams team principal Frank Williams said of his performance, "Jenson really excelled himself again driving in difficult circumstances at the end of the race and under a lot of pressure". He said while he was happy, he struggled with excess oversteer in the track's high speed corners. De La Rosa felt he could have reached lap 37 while saving fuel by being on a lean fuel map before his retirement. He was complimentary of his car and its engine, adding: "It was a shame really, because it would have been good to finish so high." Both Heidfeld and his Prost teammate Alesi attributed their lap 43 accident to poor communication with their team.

Michael Schumacher, who was involved in the first lap incident, believed that the race should have been stopped. However, he praised the work of the marshals who had assisted to recover the cars involved. He also believed that Zonta had "over-estimated his ability" and said he would have a "quiet word" with the latter. Zonta believed that the incident was not his fault and that Michael Schumacher braked harder than him, but apologised for his retirement from the race. Fisichella also agreed that the race should have been stopped, saying, "Three of the protagonists are out and it was stupid not to red flag." Benetton technical director Pat Symonds was highly critical of the driver's actions as he believed Benetton lost valuable points towards the Constructors' Championship. "The driving antics of some of our competitors at the first corner were appalling and ruined the race not only for many of the drivers but also for many of the spectators" he said.

After the race, it was announced that the FIA was investigating irregularities with an electronic box in Hakkinen's car. This was due to Formula One's governing body discovering that one mandatory paper seal was missing. Further samples from the electronic box (impounded by the FIA's technical delegates) were taken after the race; this was software downloaded which did not discover any issues with the software coding set by the FIA. A spokesman for the McLaren team said that: "No one changed the software, so there's no reason for us to be worried." At the hearing on 25 July, the FIA ruled that McLaren did not gain an advantage from the missing seal and that Häkkinen's victory would stand. However, McLaren were deducted 10 points from the Constructors' Championship and fined $50,000 for contravening Article 7 of the 2000 Formula One Sporting Regulations, which stated that competitors had to maintain some conditions of safety and eligibility during the event. McLaren did not appeal the penalty, with the team's managing director Martin Whitmarsh saying "We now consider the matter closed". The vice-president of Mercedes-Benz Motorsport Norbert Haug was critical of the decision and believed that the seal was never put on Häkkinen's car. Haug further stated that he would not take any further action regarding the matter.

The result meant Michael Schumacher's lead in the World Drivers' Championship was reduced to six points. Coulthard, who finished second, was second on 50 points, two points ahead of teammate Häkkinen and eight ahead of Barrichello. Despite not finishing, Fisichella maintained fifth place with 18 points. In the World Constructors' Championship, Ferrari maintained their lead with 92 points, McLaren's 10-point penalty meant that they remained second on 88 points. Williams jumped to third on 19 points, pushing Benetton into fourth on 18 points and BAR with 12 points moved ahead of Jordan into fifth, with seven rounds of the season remaining.

Race classification
Drivers who scored championship points are denoted in bold.

Championship standings after the race 

Drivers' Championship standings

Constructors' Championship standings

Note: Only the top five positions are included for both sets of standings.

References

Austrian Grand Prix
Grand Prix
Austrian Grand Prix
July 2000 sports events in Europe